Konstantinos Achileas Karamanlis (born 12 December 1974), commonly known as Kostas Karamanlis, is a Greek politician. From 2019 to 2023, he served as the Minister of Infrastructure and Transport in the cabinet of Kyriakos Mitsotakis.

Early life and career
Karamanlis comes from a family with long political traditions. He is the son of politician , nephew of Konstantinos Karamanlis and cousin of Kostas Karamanlis. Karamanlis studied history and economics at Hamilton College in New York, then studied at Tufts University in Massachusetts. From 2002 to 2004, he worked in London at the Swiss investment bank UBS Warburg. Later, for ten years he was managing director of a shipping company in Piraeus.

Political career
Karamanlis became involved in political activities representing New Democracy. In January 2015, he was first elected a member of the Hellenic Parliament in the Serres constituency. He successfully ran for re-election in the elections in September 2015 and 2019.

In July 2019, the Prime Minister Kyriakos Mitsotakis appointed Karamanlis with the position of Minister of Infrastructure and Transport. On 1 March 2023, he resigned in response to the previous day's Tempi train crash.

References

1974 births
Living people
Politicians from Athens
Hamilton College (New York) alumni
Tufts University alumni
New Democracy (Greece) politicians
Government ministers of Greece
Greek MPs 2015–2019
Greek MPs 2019–2023
Karamanlis family